Two destroyers of the Imperial Japanese Navy were named Umikaze:

 , an  launched in 1910, she was renamed W-7 and re-rated as a minesweeper in 1930; broken up in 1936
 , a  launched in 1936 and sunk in 1944

Imperial Japanese Navy ship names
Japanese Navy ship names